The Ministry of Education, Youth and Sport (MEJD;) is the government department of East Timor accountable for education (excluding higher education) and related matters.

Functions
The Ministry is responsible for designing, implementation, coordination and evaluation of policy for the following areas:

 education and qualification of all levels of education (excluding higher education);
 consolidation and promotion of official languages;
 youth; and
 sport.

Minister
The incumbent Minister of Education, Youth and Sport is Armindo Maia. He is assisted by António Guterres, Deputy Minister of Education, Youth and Sport, and Abrão Saldanha, Secretary of State for Youth and Sport.

See also 
 List of education ministries
 List of sports ministries
 Politics of East Timor

References

Footnote

Notes

Further reading

External links

  – official site  

Education, Youth and Sport
Education in East Timor
East Timor
East Timor
East Timor
East Timor, Education, Youth and Sport
2001 establishments in East Timor